Major-General William John Vousden,  (20 September 1848 – 12 November 1902) was a Scottish officer in the Indian Army, and recipient of the Victoria Cross, the highest and most prestigious award for gallantry in the face of the enemy that can be awarded to British and Commonwealth forces.

Military career

Vousden was born in Perth, Scotland the son of Captain Vousden, and was educated at Kings School Canterbury.

He trained at the Royal Military College, Sandhurst, and was commissioned into the 35th (Royal Sussex) Regiment of Foot in 1864. Promoted to lieutenant in 1867, and to captain in 1876, he transferred to the 5th Punjab Cavalry where he served in the Jowaki Expedition 1877–78.

Victoria cross
He was 34 years old, and a captain in the 5th Punjab Cavalry, during the Second Anglo-Afghan War when the following deed took place on 14 December 1879 on the Koh Asmai Heights, near Kabul, Afghanistan, for which he was awarded the Victoria Cross:

Further military service
He continued to serve in the 5th Punjab Cavalry, was promoted to major in 1884, and took part in further fighting on the North-West Frontier region, for which he was mentioned in despatches on 8 June 1891 and 26 January 1898. He was promoted to the brevet rank of colonel in July 1894 and the substantive rank of Colonel of the Indian Staff Corps in January 1899. He was appointed a Companion of the Order of the Bath (CB) in 1900.

In April 1901 he took a command in the Punjab Frontier Force with the temporary rank of brigadier-general, and shortly thereafter he was granted the local rank of major general.

He was appointed to act as Inspector General of Cavalry in India from October 1901, in the absence in South Africa of Colonel Edward Locke Elliot, and received the temporary rank of major general while officiating as such. Following the end of the war in South Africa, Elliott returned in late 1902, and Vousden stepped down.

He died in India of dysentery later the same year, on 12 November 1902 at the age of 54.

Family
Vousden married, in 1891, a daughter of Major-General Drummond.

References
Notes

Sources
Monuments to Courage (David Harvey, 1999)
The Register of the Victoria Cross (This England, 1997)
Scotland's Forgotten Valour (Graham Ross, 1995)

External links
 Biography

1845 births
1902 deaths
People educated at The King's School, Canterbury
Deaths from dysentery
British recipients of the Victoria Cross
British Indian Army generals
Companions of the Order of the Bath
Infectious disease deaths in India
Graduates of the Royal Military College, Sandhurst
Military personnel from Perth, Scotland
Second Anglo-Afghan War recipients of the Victoria Cross
Bengal Staff Corps officers
British military personnel of the Tirah campaign
Indian Staff Corps officers